Immanuel Evangelical Lutheran Church is a historic Evangelical Lutheran church located at E Pine and N Ziegler Street in Pilot Knob, Iron County, Missouri. It was built in 1861, and is a simple, rectangular, frame building.  It measures 30 feet, 7 inches, by 45 feet, 7 inches.  It is sheathed in clapboard and has a gable roof topped by a hexagonal cupola with a steep, pyramidal roof and apron.

It was listed on the National Register of Historic Places in 1979.

References

Lutheran churches in Missouri
Churches completed in 1861
Churches on the National Register of Historic Places in Missouri
Buildings and structures in Iron County, Missouri
National Register of Historic Places in Iron County, Missouri